Vesical plexus may refer to:
 Vesical nervous plexus
 Vesical venous plexus